Marthinus "Oupa" Versfeld (15 May 1860 – 1 September 1931) was a South African international rugby union player.

Early life and family
Born in Constantia and educated in Cape Town, where he attended SACS, Versfeld was the oldest of five brothers, four of whom played representative rugby. He and his second youngest brother, Hasie represented South Africa. His brother Loftus played for Transvaal and as an administrator was a founding member of the Eastern Province Rugby Union and of the Pretoria Rugby Subunion, which in 1938 became Northern Transvaal. The rugby stadium, Loftus Versfeld is named after him. The middle brother, Jan Hendrik Christoffel (John) represented Western Province from 1885 to 1889. All four brothers were members and played for the Hamiltons RFC, based in Sea Point, Cape Town. Versfeld died in 1931, in Cape Town, at the age of 71.

Rugby career
Versfeld played provincial rugby with Western Province and made his debut for the union in 1884. In 1885 all four brothers were in the Hamilton side that won the inaugural WP Grand Challenge Cup. In the same year they were on the Combined Cape Town team that competed in the first interprovincial competition at Grahamstown. Oupa and Hasie played alongside John in a Cape Town XV against Bill MacLagan's 1891 British tourists. Hasie became the first South African to score a try against an international touring side in Cape Town's 1–15 loss at Newlands on 9 July 1891.

Versfeld made his only Test appearances for South Africa against the touring 1891 British Isles. He played, as a forward, in all three Test matches of what was South Africa's first series as a Test nation. His brother, Hasie Versfeld, was also selected to play in the 3rd Test of the series, making the Versfelds the first brothers to represent South Africa.

Test history

See also
List of South Africa national rugby union players – Springbok no. 7

References

South African rugby union players
South Africa international rugby union players
1860 births
1931 deaths
Rugby union players from Cape Town
Western Province (rugby union) players
Hamilton RFC, Sea Point players
Rugby union forwards